Roger Wagner may refer to:

Roger Wagner, KCSG (1914-1992) American choral musician, administrator and educator.
Roger Wagner (born 1957) English artist and poet